John Hickey (c. 1955 – December 14, 2017) was a politician in Newfoundland and Labrador, Canada. He represented the district of Lake Melville in the Newfoundland and Labrador House of Assembly from 2003 to 2011. He was a member of the Progressive Conservative Party and served in the Cabinets of Danny Williams and Kathy Dunderdale.

On July 5, 2006, Hickey was appointed to the Executive Council of Newfoundland and Labrador as Minister of Transportation and Works and Minister of Labrador Affairs. Following the 2007 election, Hickey remained in cabinet as Minister of Labrador Affairs, but lost the transportation portfolio.

On June 22, 2011, Hickey confirmed that he would not seek re-election in the October 2011 provincial election.

Prior to entering provincial politics, Hickey was a municipal councillor in Happy Valley-Goose Bay for 15 years, and served as mayor in 2003.

In 2013, Hickey ran for mayor of Happy Valley-Goose Bay, but was defeated. He ran again in the 2017 municipal election, and was elected mayor by more than 800 votes.

On December 9, 2017, Hickey was seriously injured when he accidentally shot himself in the face in a hunting accident. He died on December 14, aged 62.

Electoral results

|-

|-

|-

|NDP
|Bill Cooper
|align="right"|147
|align="right"|3.5%
|align="right"|
|}

|-

|-

|-

|-

|NDP
|Barbara Stickley  
|align="right"|135
|align="right"|2.98%
|align="right"|
|}

References

1950s births
2017 deaths
Members of the Executive Council of Newfoundland and Labrador
Progressive Conservative Party of Newfoundland and Labrador MHAs
People from Happy Valley-Goose Bay
21st-century Canadian politicians
Mayors of places in Newfoundland and Labrador
Accidental deaths in Newfoundland and Labrador
Deaths by firearm in Newfoundland and Labrador
Hunting accident deaths
Firearm accident victims
Newfoundland and Labrador municipal councillors